The 1944 St. Louis Browns season was a season in American baseball. It involved the Browns finishing first in the American League with a record of 89 wins and 65 losses. In the World Series, they lost to the team they shared a stadium with, the Cardinals, four games to two.

Offseason
 February 17, 1944: Frankie Hayes was traded by the Browns to the Philadelphia Athletics for Sam Zoldak and Barney Lutz (minors).
 Prior to 1944 season: Owen Friend was signed as an amateur free agent by the Browns.

Regular season
The Browns were one of the unlikeliest pennant-winners in history; in nine out of the previous 10 seasons, they had finished in the second division. However, 1944 marked the peak of wartime conditions in Major League Baseball. The shortage of available players dragged the talent level of both major leagues down, which benefitted the St. Louis AL team.

The 1944 Browns were relatively untouched by the military draft. Nine players on the roster were 34 years old or older. Their all-4F infield included 23-year-old shortstop Vern Stephens, who led the league in RBI (109) and was second in home runs (20).

St. Louis started the season with nine straight wins and continued to hang tough in a four-team race with Detroit, Boston, and New York. It came down to the final week, when the Browns defeated the Yankees five times, winning the pennant by a game over Detroit. It was the only championship the franchise won in St. Louis; nine years later, after the 1953 season, the Browns were sold and became the Baltimore Orioles.

Season chronology
 May 26, 1944: In a game against the Boston Red Sox, Nels Potter retired the first 23 batters and was on his way to pitching a perfect game when Jim Tabor got a hit in the 8th inning.
 June 15, 1944: Frank Demaree was released by the Browns.
 July 20, 1944: Nels Potter took to the hill against Yankees' pitcher Hank Borowy. The Yankees third base coach Art Fletcher noticed that Potter was moistening his fingers. After Browns manager Luke Sewell consulted with Potter, Potter proceeded to make a deliberate motion with his fingers to his mouth. Umpire Cal Hubbard ejected Potter from the game. On July 22, American League President Will Harridge suspended Potter for 10 days for throwing an illegal pitch. Potter was the first pitcher to be suspended by Major League Baseball for that reason.
 Every team in the league hosted a game where net proceeds went toward the National War Relief and Service Inc. On July 26, the second game versus the Philadelphia Athletics was that game. Everyone had to pay their way into the stadium including team management, umpires and players. The crowd of 24,631 was the greatest for a Browns home game since the team's first night game in 1940. Oscar Zahner, chairman of the benefit game committee, announced that $25,000 was raised.
 On August 3, the Browns played the minor league Kansas City Blues. The Browns lost the game by a score of 9–8. The attendance was 5,965, which was Kansas City's best attendance all season. Despite losing, the Browns got 14 hits and Gene Moore went 4–5 with three runs batted in.
 August 8 marked the Browns 70th consecutive day in first place. This broke the club's previous record of 69 days in first place, which had been set in 1922.
The Browns beat the New York Yankees on August 12. It marked the first four-game series victory over the Yankees since 1940.
 Browns pitcher Nels Potter and Washington player George Case got into an altercation on August 22. The result was a bench clearing brawl and Potter, Case, and Washington player Ed Butka were ejected.
On September 4, the Browns found themselves out of first place. The Browns slipped to a half game behind the New York Yankees with 22 games left.
On October 1, the last day of the season, St. Louis clinched the pennant with a come-from-behind 5–2 victory over New York on two home runs by Chet Laabs and one by Vern Stephens.
The final series between the Browns and the Senators had its share of tension. In the first game of the series, Senators pitcher Roger Wolff hit Vern Stephens with a pitch. Browns manager Luke Sewell waved a bat in the direction of the pitcher.
September 21 was the final game between the Browns and the Senators. Browns catcher Tom Turner engaged in a fist fight with Senators player Roberto Ortiz. The two players lined up in a boxing formation in the middle of the field. Ortiz broke his hand and this was bad for the Browns as the Senators were finishing the season against the Detroit Tigers. At the time of the Browns-Senators game, the Tigers were in first place. The conflicts strained the friendship of Washington manager Ossie Bluege and Luke Sewell. The two were teammates in Washington from 1933 to 1934.
After the Browns farm team, the Toledo Mud Hens was eliminated from the American Association, the Browns called three players to bolster their team for their stretch run. The callups were Earl Jones (10–6 for the Mudhens), infielder Len Schulte (.296 batting average, 96 RBI's), and outfielder Babe Martin, the American Association Most Valuable Player.
With six games left in the season, the Browns and Tigers had identical 84–64 records. The last six games of the season for the Browns were against the Boston Red Sox and the New York Yankees.

Opening Day lineup

Season standings

Record vs. opponents

Roster

Player stats

Batting

Starters by position
Note: Pos = Position; G = Games played; AB = At bats; H = Hits; Avg. = Batting average; HR = Home runs; RBI = Runs batted in

Other batters
Note: G = Games played; AB = At bats; H = Hits; Avg. = Batting average; HR = Home runs; RBI = Runs batted in

Pitching

Starting pitchers
Note: G = Games pitched; IP = Innings pitched; W = Wins; L = Losses; ERA = Earned run average; SO = Strikeouts

Other pitchers
Note: G = Games pitched; IP = Innings pitched; W = Wins; L = Losses; ERA = Earned run average; SO = Strikeouts

Relief pitchers
Note: G = Games pitched; Innings pitched; W = Wins; L = Losses; SV = Saves; ERA = Earned run average; SO = Strikeouts

1944 World Series 

NL St. Louis Cardinals (4) vs. AL St. Louis Browns (2)

Awards and honors
All-Star Game
 George McQuinn, starter
 Vern Stephens, starter
 Bob Muncrief, reserve

League leaders 
 Frank Mancuso, Most errors in a season by a catcher (17)

Team leaders
 Home runs – Vern Stephens (20)
 RBI – Vern Stephens (109)
 Batting average – Mike Kreevich (.301)
 Hits – Vern Stephens (164)
 Stolen bases – Don Gutteridge (20)
 Wins – Nels Potter (19)
 Earned run average – George Caster (2.44)
 Strikeouts – Jack Kramer (124)

Farm system

LEAGUE CHAMPIONS: Newark

References

External links
1944 St. Louis Browns team page at Baseball Reference
1944 St. Louis Browns season at baseball-almanac.com

St. Louis Browns seasons
Saint Louis Browns season
American League champion seasons
St Louis Browns